Cyril Samuel Hammond (10 October 1927 – 10 September 2016) was an English footballer who made nearly 300 appearances in the Football League playing as a left half for Charlton Athletic and Colchester United.

He was a member of the London XI that competed in the inaugural edition of the Fairs Cup; he appeared just once, in the group stage of the competition.

References

External links
League statistics at Neil Brown's site

1927 births
2016 deaths
Footballers from Woolwich
English footballers
Association football wing halves
Erith & Belvedere F.C. players
Charlton Athletic F.C. players
Colchester United F.C. players
English Football League players
London XI players